Pagyda is a genus of moths of the family Crambidae.

Species
Pagyda amphisalis (Walker, 1859)
Pagyda arbiter (Butler, 1879)
Pagyda argyritis Hampson, 1899
Pagyda atriplagiata Hampson, 1917
Pagyda botydalis (Snellen, [1880])
Pagyda calida Hampson, 1898
Pagyda citrinella Inoue, 1996
Pagyda discolor Swinhoe, 1894
Pagyda fumosa Kenrick, 1912
Pagyda griseotincta Caradja, 1939
Pagyda hargreavesi Tams, 1941
Pagyda lustralis Snellen, 1890
Pagyda nebulosa Wileman & South, 1917
Pagyda ochrealis Wileman, 1911
Pagyda orthocrates Meyrick, 1938
Pagyda perlustralis  Rebel, 1915
Pagyda poeasalis (Walker, 1859)
Pagyda pullalis Swinhoe, 1903
Pagyda pulvereiumbralis (Hampson, 1918)
Pagyda quadrilineata Butler, 1881
Pagyda quinquelineata Hering, 1903
Pagyda rubricatalis Swinhoe, 1890
Pagyda salvalis Walker, 1859
Pagyda schaliphora Hampson, 1899
Pagyda sounanalis Legrand, 1966

Former species
Pagyda trivirgalis de Joannis, 1932

References

Natural History Museum Lepidoptera genus database

Pyraustinae
Crambidae genera
Taxa named by Francis Walker (entomologist)